Argyrophorodes suttoni is a moth in the family Crambidae. It was described by David John Lawrence Agassiz in 2012. It is found in the Democratic Republic of the Congo.

The wingspan is 16–17 mm. The forewings are white, the costa with fuscous marks along the inner two-thirds. There is a yellow antemedian fascia and there are two wavy pale fuscous crosslines. The base of the hindwings is yellowish, with a yellow postmedian band.

Etymology
The species is named for Dr Stephen Sutton, who first collected the species.

References

Acentropinae
Moths described in 2012
Moths of Africa